Tom Leeb (born 21 March, 1989) is a French actor, singer and comedian. He would have represented France in the Eurovision Song Contest 2020 at Rotterdam, the Netherlands, with the song "Mon alliée (The Best in Me)".

Biography

Family 
Leeb is the son of humorist Michel Leeb and journalist Béatrice Malicet, Tom Leeb was born in Paris in 1989. He is the youngest in the family, after Fanny (born in 1986) and Elsa (born in 1988).

Career 
In 2003, he played in the theater with his father in Madame Doubtfire. He studied theater, cinema, singing and dance in New York for five years. 

In 2013, he was chosen for the role of Tom in the series Sous le soleil de Saint-Tropez, then played the role of Adrien in an episode Section de recherches. The same year, he played in the film Paroles. 

He appeared in the film Avis de mistral, with Jean Reno in 2014. The same year, he formed a comic duet with the actor Kevin Levy and together they created their first show Kevin et Tom. The two comedians were the opening act of Gad Elmaleh at the Olympia then went on tour on Parisian stages. In parallel with their show, they launched a new format, mini-video sequences of around 3 minutes entitled: "How ...". 

In March 2018, he released his first single "Are We Too Late" under the Roy Music label. He is inspired by artists like John Mayer, Matt Corby or even Ben Howard. 

On 14 January 2020, the public national television channel France 2 announced that it has selected Tom Leeb to represent France at the Eurovision Song Contest 2020, scheduled for May 16, with his song "Mon alliée (The Best in Me)". The competition was cancelled on March 18, however, due to the COVID-19 pandemic. On June 19, 2020, Leeb confirmed that he would not represent France in the Eurovision Song Contest 2021.

Discography

Studio albums

Extended plays

Singles

Filmography

Movies 

 2013  : Paroles by Véronique Mucret Rouveyrollis
 2014  : My Summer in Provence (French : Avis de mistral) by Rose Bosch : Tiago
 2017  : Jour-J by Reem Kherici : Gabriel
 2017  : Overdrive by Antonio Negret : the American tourist n°2
 2017  : Mon poussin by Frédéric Forestier : Romain
 2017  : Papillon by Michael Noer : lawyer Dega
 2017  : The New Adventures of Cinderella (French : Les Nouvelles Aventures de Cendrillon) by Lionel Steketee : the dwarf Relou
 2019  : Edmond by Alexis Michalik : Leo Volny
 2020  : C'est la vie of Julien Rambaldi : Jérôme
 2021  : Spoiled Brats by Nicolas Cuche Netflix
 2021 : Stuck Together by Dany Boon - Sam ([[Netflix]])
 2021  : Pierre & Jeanne " by Clémentine Célarié from a work of Guy de Maupassant

 Short films 

 2009  : One Shot by Miguel Parga
 2013  : Subtitles by Allan Duboux and himself
 2015  : This New Generation by himself : Joe
 2017 : Lola & Eddie by Charlotte Karas and Jordan Goldnadel : Eddie
 2016  : Happy Anniversary by Franck Victor
 2017  : Unexpected by Jessy Langlois : Jeremy
 2017  : Momentum by David Solal : Ron
 2016  : Jeux de grands by Celine Gaudry
 2021 : “Des Corps” de Tom Leeb

 TV shows 

 2013 - 2014  : Sous le soleil de Saint-Tropez  : Tom Drancourt (seasons 1 and 2)
 2014  : Section de recherches  : David Bréand (season 8, episode 9 : Cyrano )
 2018  : Nina  : Anto (season 4, episode 4 : D'abord ne pas nuire )
 2020 : “Infidèle” Saison 2 TF1 - Gabriel 
 2021 : “Plan B” saison 1 TF1 - Manu
 2021 : “Les Combattantes”

 Theater 

 2003  : Madame Doubtfire, adapted by Albert Algoud, directed by Daniel Roussel, Théâtre de Paris
 2013  : Kevin & Tom''

References

External links
 
https://www.thetimes.co.uk/article/french-eurovision-song-contest-entry-by-tom-leeb-denounced-for-using-english-lyrics-qggwmkdtp The Times

French male singers
Eurovision Song Contest entrants of 2020
Eurovision Song Contest entrants for France
French people of German descent
1989 births
Living people